Shooting Sizemore is an American reality documentary television series that debuted January 7, 2007 on VH1. The series follows Tom Sizemore as he overcomes his addiction and gets his life, along with his career, back to the way it was. It also showed Sizemore as he worked to settle the demons of his past.

Episodes

References

External links
 

2000s American reality television series
2007 American television series debuts
2007 American television series endings
English-language television shows
VH1 original programming